Abelard George "Abe" Espinsosa (February 9, 1889 – February 13, 1980) was an American professional golfer who is best known as the first Hispanic-American to win a significant professional championship.

Born in Monterey, California, Espinosa was of Spanish descent, a club professional in Oakland, Chicago (Columbian Golf Club and Medinah Country Club), and at Shreveport Country Club in Louisiana, where one of his caddies was future U.S. Open Champion Tommy Bolt. Espinosa's younger brother Al (1891–1957) was also a professional golfer; both were known for their dashing, stylish attire on the links.

Espinosa's first PGA Tour win came at the Western Open in 1928. His best finish in a major was a tie for seventh at the U.S. Open in 1924. After his playing days were over, he became involved in golf course architecture and design; his works include Heart River Municipal Golf Course in Dickinson, North Dakota.

Professional wins (4)

PGA Tour wins (3)
1928 Western Open, Chicago Open Championship
1931 Texas Open

Other wins (1)
1931 Illinois PGA Championship

References

American male golfers
PGA Tour golfers
Golf course architects
Golfers from California
American sportspeople of Mexican descent
Sportspeople from Monterey, California
1889 births
1980 deaths